Sir John Robert O'Connell  MRIA, FSA (1868–28 December 1943) was an Irish solicitor, business man, and, after the death of his wife, a Roman Catholic priest.

O'Connell was born in 1868 the only son of Thomas Francis O'Connell, a solicitor of Dublin, Ireland. He is education was a Master of Arts and Doctor of Laws. He was admitted as a solicitor in Ireland in 1889, and became head of the firm of Thomas F. O'Connell & Son, Solicitors, Dublin;. He held a directorship of the National Bank of Ireland, Ltd.; solicitor to Dublin and South Eastern Railway Co.; was a member of governing body of University College Cork; Vice-President Statistical and Social Enquiry Society of Ireland; and member of Board of Superintendence of Dublin Hospitals.

He married Mary Scally, eldest daughter of Thomas Scally of Deepwell in 1901.  He was created a Knight Bachelor in 1914, and was a justice of the peace for County Cork. Following the death of his wife in 1929 he was ordained a Roman Catholic priest in Westminster by Cardinal Bourne. He was attached for a time to Warwick-street Church and St. Patrick's Soho-square, London, and died at Brockenhurst, Hampshire, on 28 December 1943.

References

1868 births
Knights Bachelor
Irish knights
Irish solicitors
Irish businesspeople
1943 deaths
20th-century Irish Roman Catholic priests